Radha Kalyanam is a 1981 Indian Telugu-language romantic drama film written by Mullapudi Venkata Ramana and directed by Bapu It is a remake of the Tamil film Andha 7 Naatkal (1981) directed by K. Bhagyaraj. The film stars Chandra Mohan, Raadhika and Sarath Babu. It was released on 3 December 1981. Bapu went on to direct the Hindi version titled Woh Saat Din in 1983.

Plot 
The movie is a triangle love story between the lover, the heroine and her husband. Radha (Raadhika) is a typical girl from a lower-middle-class family. She falls deeply in love with the new tenant upstairs, Palghat Madhavan (Chandramohan). Madhavan aspires to be a great music director, but struggles to get by. He is attracted to Radha.

Dr. Anand (Sarath Babu), a widower, is forced to marry Radha to fulfill the wish of his dying mother. He fully intends to keep his promise of returning Radha to her rightful owner and partner, Madhavan, after hearing Radha's reason behind attempting suicide on their first night. Events lead to conflict in her mind between the husband and lover. Whom should Radha choose and why?

Cast 
 Chandra Mohan as Palghat Madhavan
 Raadhika as Radha
 Sarath Babu as Dr. Anand
 Tadepalli Lakshmi Kanta Rao
 Raavi Kondala Rao
 Pushpalata
 Sakshi Ranga Rao
 Radhabai

Production 
Bhagyaraj's then wife initially wanted him to reprise his role from the original film, but he decided against doing so due to his lack of fluency in Telugu; the role went to Chandra Mohan.

Soundtrack 
The music was composed by K. V. Mahadevan.
 "Bangaru Bala Pichuka" -
 "Chetiki Gajulla" – S. P. Balasubrahmanyam, Jyothirmayi
 "Kalanaina Kshanamaina" - P, Susheela, S. P. Balasubrahmanyam 
 "Palaghat Madhavan" -
 "Yemmogudo" -
 "chittikeyave chinadaa" - P. Susheela, S.P. Balasubrahmanyam
"chittikeya" - P. Susheela, S.P. Balasubrahmanyam

References

External links 
 

1980s Telugu-language films
1981 films
1981 romantic drama films
Films directed by Bapu
Films scored by K. V. Mahadevan
Indian romantic drama films
Telugu remakes of Tamil films